"Heaven 'N Hell" is the fourth and final single released from Salt-n-Pepa's fourth studio album, Very Necessary. In the United States, it was released alongside "None of Your Business" as a double-A sided single. The song samples "Think About It" by Odell Brown & the Organ-izers, "Synthetic Substitution" by Melvin Bliss and "Heaven and Hell is on Earth" by 20th Century Steel Band. "Heaven 'N Hell" became a top-30 hit in Australia and New Zealand.

Track listing
Australasian CD single
 "Heaven 'N Hell" (remix)
 "Let's Talk About AIDS"
 "Shoop" (Ghetto Lab Radio Edit)
 "Heaven 'N Hell" (Carron Hall Mix)

Charts

References

1993 songs
1994 singles
London Records singles
Salt-N-Pepa songs
Songs written by Hurby Azor